G. Gordon Strong (December 28, 1913 – November 13, 2006) was a Canadian-born newspaper publisher.

He was born in Vancouver, British Columbia in 1913 and completed degrees in economics and commerce at the University of British Columbia, an MBA from Northwestern University and a law degree from the University of Toledo. He was hired as general manager by Brush-Moore Newspapers in 1952, later becoming president. He became chairman of Thomson Newspapers (later part of Thomson Corporation), after Brush-Moore was taken over by Thomson in 1967. He retired in 1977. Later that same year, he was hired as the publisher of The Oakland Tribune, retiring again in 1979.

He died of pneumonia in Pasadena, California in 2006.

References 

1913 births
2006 deaths
Deaths from pneumonia in California
Canadian emigrants to the United States
Northwestern University alumni
Businesspeople from Vancouver
University of British Columbia alumni
University of Toledo alumni
20th-century American businesspeople